The Book of Not is a novel by Zimbabwean author Tsitsi Dangarembga, published in 2006. The novel is semi-autobiographical, set in colonial Rhodesia. The story is told from the perspective of Tambudzai as she attends a convent boarding school in Rhodesia. In The Book of Not,  Tambu's story continues from when it previously left off in the prequel, Nervous Conditions (1988). In May 2018, the BBC named Nervous Conditions as one of the top 100 books that have shaped the world, listing the novel at number 66.

Major themes
 Prejudice/Inequalities 
 War/Revolution

References

External links
The Book of Not page at Ayebia
 Helon Habila, "In time of war" (review of The Book of Not), The Guardian, 4 November 2006.

2006 Zimbabwean novels
2006 novels
Novels set in Rhodesia
Books by Tsitsi Dangarembga